(born 28 December 1983), is a Japanese former professional tennis player. In July 2008, she was the second highest WTA-ranked Japanese singles tennis player, at No. 107, after Ai Sugiyama.

Nakamura was born in Tennōji-ku, Osaka. Like her role-model Monica Seles, she had a double-handed forehand and backhand, but served right-handed. She won four singles and three doubles titles on the ITF Circuit. In 2006, she reached the final of the Japan Open in Tokyo, where she lost to Marion Bartoli in three sets.

Nakamura also played for the Japan Fed Cup team. She retired from professional tennis in 2012.

WTA career finals

Singles: 1 (runner-up)

Doubles: 1 (runner-up)

ITF Circuit finals

Singles: 10 (4–6)

Doubles: 6 (3–3)

References

External links
 
 
 

1983 births
Japanese female tennis players
Living people
Sportspeople from Osaka
Asian Games medalists in tennis
Tennis players at the 2006 Asian Games
Medalists at the 2006 Asian Games
Asian Games bronze medalists for Japan
20th-century Japanese women
21st-century Japanese women